Ronald Simpson (25 February 1934 – 11 November 2010) was an English professional footballer, born in Carlisle, Cumberland, who played as a midfielder in the Football League for Huddersfield Town, Sheffield United and Carlisle United and in the Scottish Football League for Queen of the South. He died on 11 November 2010 following a short illness. There was a floral tribute to Simpson at Bramall Lane in his honour. His funeral was on 18 November 2010.

References

1934 births
2010 deaths
Footballers from Carlisle, Cumbria
English footballers
Association football midfielders
Huddersfield Town A.F.C. players
Sheffield United F.C. players
Carlisle United F.C. players
Queen of the South F.C. players
English Football League players
Scottish Football League players